Big Pine or Big Pines may refer to:

Big Pine, California, an unincorporated community
Big Pines, California, an unincorporated community
Big Pine Creek (disambiguation)
Big Pine Lake (Isanti County, Minnesota), a lake in Minnesota
Big Pine Mountain, a mountain in California
Big Pine Reservation